Gouripur Union is a union parishad under Daudkandi Upazila of Comilla District in the Chittagong Division of eastern Bangladesh.

References

Unions of Daudkandi Upazila